Ucio is one of nine parishes (administrative divisions) in Ribadesella, a municipality within the province and autonomous community of Asturias, in northern Spain.

Villages
Ardines
San Miguel de Ucio 
Sardalla
Sebreño

Parishes in Ribadesella